Phorest Salon Software, a subsidiary of nDevor Systems Limited, is an SaaS company that specializes in computer software for hairdressers, spas, and beauty salon owners. 

The Phorest software is used in more than 8,000 salons in ten countries worldwide. The software manages all aspects of the salons business, including appointments, stock, reporting and rotas.

History 
Phorest was founded in 2002, by Ronan Perceval in Dublin, Ireland. The company has offices in London, Helsinki, Finland, Brisbane, Australia Cologne, Germany and Philadelphia, USA.

Phorest first designed and developed an online messenger application, known as "Phorest Messenger", that it released in Ireland. By May 2005, Phorest  had 100 clients.  In June 2005, Phorest acquired their largest competitor, Stylebase, adding 170 salons. At this point the company focused on becoming the number one provider of salon software in the European Union and USA. Phorest competitors include Millennium and Daysmart.

On 19 August 2011, Phorest announced it had received a seed investment of €1.3m from Enterprise Ireland and private investors.

In June 2018, the company announced a €20m round of funding from Susquehanna Growth Equity for international expansion.

Honors and awards 
 2003: Runner-up Coca-Cola National Enterprise Award
 2005: Dublin City Enterprise Award  
 2011: iGAP Top Selection
 2016: Deloitte Fast 50
 2017: Deloitte Fast 50
 2018: Deloitte Fast 50

References

External links 

Susquehanna Growth Equity
Business software companies
Software companies of Ireland
Cloud applications
Business software